KRKY may refer to:

 KRKY (AM), a radio station (930 AM) licensed to serve Granby, Colorado, United States
 KRKY-FM, a radio station (88.1 FM) licensed to serve Douglas, Wyoming, United States
 KVXO, a radio station (88.3 FM) licensed to serve Fort Collins, Colorado, which held the call sign KRKY-FM in 2015
 KGRE-FM, a radio station (102.1 FM) licensed to serve Estes Park, Colorado, which held the call sign KRKY-FM from 2006 to 2015